The Virgin Mary Monastery is a ruined monastery in the Giresun Province of Turkey. Built into a cave in the Pontic Mountains, the monastery sits high above ground, up a steep flight of stairs. The four-story building contains a dining room, church, rooms for the monks, and a classroom.

History
The Virgin Mary Monastery dates back to at least the Byzantine period. It resembles the famous Sumela Monastery, which Turkish sources estimate was completed in the late 4th century. Sumela is also a former Greek Orthodox monastery built into a cliff.

Hulusi Güleç, the director of culture and tourism in Giresun, says the monastery was first used during Roman occupation of Anatolia. According to him, early Christians secretly practiced within the monastery during the persecution of Christians in the Roman Empire.

Virgin Mary Monastery lies in the borders of Şebinkarahisar District, a subdivision of Giresun Province. In the 1880s, the area around Şebinkarahisar had a little over 8,000 Pontian Greeks. Every year between the 26th and 28th of August, Greeks from nearby visited the monastery to celebrate and worship.

However, the Greek/Turkish population exchange severely decreased the Pontian Greek presence in the region. The 1939 Erzincan earthquake made the abandoned monastery inaccessible, after which it fell into great disrepair.

Restoration and tourism
In the early 2010s, the four-story monastery underwent restoration work. This was an effort to make the monastery into a tourist attraction, especially while Sumela Monastery, another tourist draw, was closed for repairs. 

Both Anadolu Agency, a state-run Turkish news source, and an independently run paper report that the monastery has recently attracted the Pontian Greek diaspora. Forty residents of Kavala, Greece, descendants of Pontians forced out of Şebinkarahisar during the population exchange, visited Virgin Mary Monastery in 2015.

References

External links
Photographs
Patriarch Bartholomew visits the monastery (video)

Byzantine monasteries in Turkey
Buildings and structures in Giresun Province
Tourist attractions in Giresun Province
Ruined churches in Turkey